In Brazilian culture, Gérson's Law (Portuguese: Lei de Gérson) is an adage which reflects the way Brazilians behave towards themselves, immortalizing concepts such as jeitinho and malandragem. In short, Gérson's Law says one should take unfair advantage out of every possible situation, having no concern for ethics. 

This expression came into use once a TV commercial for the cigarette brand Vila Rica, starring Brazilian footballer Gérson, was aired around 1970. While he is a very well known football player in Brazil and worldwide, Gérson had always been a source for controversy. In the commercial, that particular cigarette brand was portrayed as advantageous for being better and cheaper in comparison to other brands, and at the end of the commercial, Gérson says "I like to get an advantage in everything. Get an advantage too, get Vila Rica".

Later, the player resented having his image connected to the ad, since all kinds of unethical behaviors were linked to his name with reference to the law.

References 

Adages
Advertising campaigns
Brazilian cultural conventions
Corruption in Brazil